Gambling is a 1934 American crime film directed by Rowland V. Lee and written by Garrett Graham. It is based on the 1929 play Gambling by George M. Cohan. The film stars George M. Cohan, Wynne Gibson, Dorothy Burgess, Theodore Newton, Harold Healy and Walter Gilbert. The film was released on November 3, 1934, by Fox Film Corporation.

Plot

Cast
George M. Cohan as Al Draper
Wynne Gibson as Maizie Fuller
Dorothy Burgess as Dorothy Kane
Theodore Newton as Ray Braddock
Harold Healy as Ben Connolly
Walter Gilbert as Insp. Freelock
Cora Witherspoon as Mrs. Edna Seeley
Joseph Allen Sr. as Joe
Percy Ames as Mr. B
Six Spirits of Rhythm as Speciality Number

References

External links
 

1934 films
American crime films
1934 crime films
Fox Film films
Films directed by Rowland V. Lee
American black-and-white films
1930s English-language films
1930s American films
English-language crime films